Ward Lake is a  lake located on Vancouver Island at the headwaters of Ward Creek  north of the Sproat Lake.

References

Alberni Valley
Lakes of Vancouver Island
Alberni Land District